Veprecula echinulata is a species of sea snail, a marine gastropod mollusk in the family Raphitomidae.

This is not Veprecula echinulata Springsteen & Leobrera, 1986 (this is probably Veprecula vepratica)

Description
The length of the shell varies between 3.5 mm and 12 mm.

Distribution
This marine species occurs off the Zanzibar Channel (Tanzania) and Easter Island.

References

External links
 
 Raines, Bret K. "New molluscan records from Easter Island, with the description of a new Ethminolia." Visaya 2.1 (2007): 70-88.

echinulata
Gastropods described in 1925